Shide may refer to:  

 Shide (monk), Chinese Buddhist monk and poet
 Shide (Shinto), a zig-zag shaped paper streamer associated with Shinto
 Shide, Isle of Wight, settlement on the Isle of Wight, England
 Dalian Shide F.C., a former Chinese football club
 Shide Group, a Chinese building supply company that owned Dalian Shide F.C.